Clarksville is an unincorporated community in Howard County, Maryland; the second highest-earning county in the United States according to the U.S. Census Bureau. The community is named for William Clark, a farmer who owned much of the land on which the community now lies and served as a postal stop that opened on the 4th of July 1851.

Some of the most expensive homes on the East Coast are located in or around the town, whose property values are among the highest in the country. According to the U.S. Census Bureau, Clarksville District 5 has a population of 56,239, with an estimated average income of $195,124, with median income of $160,606.

The village of River Hill (which include Pheasant Ridge and Pointers Run),  the newest addition to the Rouse Company development of Columbia, is adjacent to Clarksville.

Clarksville's public schools, part of the Howard County public school system, are among the highest-ranked in the nation and often have significantly higher funding than competing private and charter schools.

The area is located southwest of Baltimore and north of Washington, D.C., and many residents of Clarksville commute to work in one of these two cities or their nearby suburbs.

Montrose and Richland Farm are listed on the National Register of Historic Places in 1973.

History
In 1699, Thomas Browne, a Patuxent Ranger, ranged the river from the Snowden plantation to where Clarksville is sited.  The area was settled with tobacco plantations such as Folly Quarter and Hobbs Regulation with slave labor. In 1838, Dr. William Watkins of Richland Manor proposed the "Howard District" of Anne Arundel County, which became Howard County in 1851. Clarksville's name originates from John R. Clark's family who immigrated from Ireland to the Howard District of Anne Arundel County in 1790. The land he purchased included Jack Howard's blacksmith shop, one of the few African American operated blacksmith's in the county.   Clarksville postal office listed the population as just 65 in the 1930s with the key industry of agriculture and limestone mining. Numerous apple orchards were situated between Clarksville and Ashton. In 1869 the town became the terminus of the ten mile Ellicott City and Clarksville turnpike built over the old Sandy Spring road, a ten-mile private toll road created in a time before county maintained roads which later became route 108.

Schooling
There are four public schools located in Clarksville, Maryland. There are two elementary schools, Pointers Run Elementary School and Clarksville Elementary School, while there is one middle school, Clarksville Middle School, and one high school, River Hill High School. All four schools are part of the Howard County Public School System (HCPSS).

Climate
The climate in this area is characterized by hot, humid summers and generally mild to cool winters.  According to the Köppen Climate Classification system, Clarksville has a humid subtropical climate, abbreviated "Cfa" on climate maps.

People
The following are notable people who were born or live in Clarksville, Maryland:
Lefty Clarke, Major League Baseball pitcher who played in one game on October 2, 1921. 
 Kevin Johnson, retired NFL cornerback.
Donovan Pines MLS, player for D.C. United.
Varun Ram, former Maryland Terrapins basketball player.

See also
Clifton (Clarksville, Maryland) – an 1818 stone home built on the "White Wine & Claret" farm of John Dorsey
Worthington's Range 
Montrose
Richland Farm
Walnut Grove

References

 
Unincorporated communities in Howard County, Maryland
Unincorporated communities in Maryland